The Ministry for Pacific Peoples (MPP), formerly the Ministry of Pacific Island Affairs, is the public service department of New Zealand charged with advising the government on policies and issues affecting Pasifika communities in New Zealand. MPP seeks to promote the status of Pasifika peoples in New Zealand by keeping them informed of the issues, then acting as an advocate in dealing with other state sector organisations.

Functions and structure
The Ministry for Pacific Peoples' stated objective is to promote the development of Pacific Islanders living in New Zealand so that they can contribute fully to New Zealand's social and economic life. The Ministry advocates for the Pacific community within the public sector by working with other government agencies and departments to meet Pasifika people's needs, and monitoring policies that affect Pacific people. It also encourages Pasifika leadership in public sector organisations whose decisions affect Pacific communities.

The current Minister for Pacific Peoples is Aupito William Sio. The current Chief Executive of the Ministry for Pacific Peoples is Laulu Mr Mac Leauanae.

History
The Ministry of Pacific Island Affairs was first established in 1990 to look after New Zealand's growing Pasifika population. Prior to that, Pacific communities living in New Zealand fell under the responsibility of several government departments including the Te Puni Kōkiri (Ministry of Māori Development) and the Department of Internal Affairs's Pacific Affairs Unit. In 1975, Pacific communities established the Pacific Island Advisory Council to address their socio-economic needs. The council established education resource and multicultural centres while the Pasifika communities lobbied for a stand-alone ministry.

On 22 December 2015, the Ministry announced it would be changing its name to the Ministry for Pacific Peoples, to reflect the growing number of Pasifika children born in New Zealand.  A new visual identity, designed by two design students of Pacific descent and based around three manu (birds), was also introduced to represent a message of travel, freedom and success.

On 31 August 2017, the Ministry relocated its Auckland office from East Tāmaki to a new office in Manukau, which is home to most of the country's Pacific population. This office is part of a joint hub shared with Te Puni Kōkiri, which deals with Māori affairs.

List of Ministers

The table below lists ministers who have held responsibility for Pacific Island Affairs. Initially, the title used to be Minister of Pacific Island Affairs but was renamed Minister for Pacific Peoples on 22 December 2015.

Hon. Richard Prebble, Labour Party, Fourth Labour Government, 15 August 1984- 25 August 1988, 4 February 1990 – 6 September 1990
Hon. Russell Marshall, Labour Party, Fourth Labour Government, 6 September 1988 – 12 December 1989
Hon. Bill Birch, National Party Fourth National Government, 28 November 1990 – 22 August 1991
Hon. Don McKinnon, National Party, Fourth National Government, 24 September 1991- 13 August 1998
Hon. Tuariki Delamere, Te Tawharau, Fourth National Government, 18 August 1998-late 1999
Hon. Mark Gosche, Labour Party, Fifth Labour Government, 10 December 1999 – 12 May 2003
Hon. Phil Goff, Labour Party, Fifth Labour Government, 19 May 2003 – 5 November 2007
Hon. Luamanuvao Winnie Laban, Labour Party, Fifth Labour Government, 5 November 2007 – 19 November 2008
Hon. Georgina te Heuheu, National Party, Fifth National Government, 19 November 2008 – 14 December 2011
Hon. Hekia Parata, National Party, Fifth National Government, 14 December 2011 – 27 January 2014
Hon. Peseta Sam Lotu-Iiga, National Party, Fifth National Government, 28 January 2014 – 20 December 2016
Hon. Alfred Ngaro, National Party, Fifth National Government, 20 December 2016 – 26 October 2017
Hon. Aupito William Sio, Labour Party, Sixth Labour Government, 26 October 2017– 31 January 2023
Hon. Barbara Edmonds, Labour Party, Sixth Labour Government, 1 February 2023 - present

Notes

Further reading

External links

New Zealand Public Service departments